Charters Towers Airport  is an airport located in Columbia, Charters Towers, Queensland, Australia,  north of the Charters Towers CBD.

History

World War II

During World War II, the United States Army Air Forces Fifth Air Force stationed the following units at the airfield:

 No. 22 Squadron RAAF, A-20 Boston
 3d Bombardment Group, (10 March 1942 – 28 January 1943) (Headquarters)
 8th Bombardment Squadron, A-20 Havoc (17–31 March 1942; 9 May 1942 – 28 January 1943)
 90th Bombardment Squadron, A-20 Havoc (8 March 1942 – 28 January 1943)

 431st Fighter Squadron (475th Fighter Group), P-38 Lightning (14 May – 1 July 1943)
 432d Fighter Squadron (475th Fighter Group), P-38 Lightning (14 May – 11 July 1943)
 433d Fighter Squadron (475th Fighter Group), P-38 Lightning (14 May – 17 June 1943)
 16th Bombardment Squadron (Light) (27th Bombardment Group (Light)), A-24 Dauntless (1 April – 4 May 1942)
 17th Bombardment Squadron (Light) (27th Bombardment Group (Light)), A-24 Dauntless (1 April – 4 May 1942)
 91st Bombardment Squadron (Light) (27th Bombardment Group (Light)), A-24 Dauntless (24 March 1942)

In addition, 370th Service Squadron managed the day to day USAAF Base operations of the airfield.

Heritage listings
Charters Towers Airport has a heritage listing for the Bore Sight Range and Compass Swinging Platform established during World War II.

See also
 United States Army Air Forces in Australia (World War II)
 List of airports in Queensland

References

External links

Airports in Queensland
Airfields of the United States Army Air Forces in Australia
Charters Towers
Queensland in World War II